Heikant is a hamlet in the former municipality of Sint Anthonis, in the Dutch province of North Brabant. It is located about 2 km south of Oploo. Since 2022 it has been part of the new municipality of Land van Cuijk.

References

Populated places in North Brabant
Geography of Land van Cuijk